Castaway Island (or Qalito) is an island of the Mamanuca Group in Fiji. It is inhabited, with a tourist resort on its west side.

Access

It is accessible by either boat, seaplane or helicopter. The sea trip takes about 1 hour and 50 minutes, travelling past several other Mamanuca Islands.

Traditional Fijian name and present-day use
Known traditionally by the Fijians as “Qalito”, Castaway Island today is a private island resort used for holidays and vacations - in particular honeymoons and family holiday vacations.

Island inhabitants
The Fijian resort staff live on-island in a staff village. The bulk of the staff are from the Main island of Viti Levu.

References

Islands of Fiji
Ba Province
Mamanuca Islands
Private islands of Fiji